This is a list of teams and cyclists for the 2004 Vuelta a España.

(*) Declared not fit to start before the Tour. 

2004 Vuelta a España
2004